Marc Thaddeus Campbell (November 29, 1884 – February 13, 1946) was a shortstop in Major League Baseball. He played for the Pittsburgh Pirates in 1907.

References

External links

1884 births
1946 deaths
People from Punxsutawney, Pennsylvania
Major League Baseball shortstops
Pittsburgh Pirates players
Baseball players from Pennsylvania
Rochester Bronchos players
Erie Sailors players
Fond du Lac Giants players
Fond du Lac Mudhens players